Nagavarappadu is a village in Krishna district of the Indian state of Andhra Pradesh. It is located in Unguturu mandal of Nuzvid revenue division. It is a part of Andhra Pradesh Capital Region.

See also 
List of villages in Krishna district

References

Villages in Krishna district